Let's Love and Laugh is a 1931 British-German comedy film directed by Richard Eichberg and starring Gene Gerrard, Muriel Angelus and Dennis Wyndham. A German-language version, Die Bräutigamswitwe, was made at the same time. It was based on the play, Unwelcome Wife, written by Edward A. Paulton and Fred Thompson.

The film launched Gerrard as a popular star, and he went on to appear in a series of comedies for British International Pictures.

Plot
Two philanderers marry each other.

Cast
 Gene Gerrard as The Bridegroom
 Muriel Angelus as The Bride Who Was
 Margaret Yarde as Bride's mother
 Frank Stanmore as Bride's father
 Dennis Wyndham as Bride's fiancé
 Henry Wenman as The Butler
 Rita Page as The Bride Who Wasn't
 Ronald Frankau as Father
 George K. Gee as Detective

References

Bibliography
 Low, Rachael. Filmmaking in 1930s Britain. George Allen & Unwin, 1985.
 Wood, Linda. British Films, 1927-1939. British Film Institute, 1986.

External links

1931 films
1931 musical comedy films
Films shot at British International Pictures Studios
Films directed by Richard Eichberg
British musical comedy films
British films based on plays
British multilingual films
British black-and-white films
1931 multilingual films
1930s English-language films
1930s British films